A kobzar (pl. kobzari ) was an itinerant Ukrainian bard who sang to his own accompaniment, played on a multistringed bandura or kobza.

Tradition

Kobzars were often blind and became predominantly so by the 1800s.  Kobzar literally means 'kobza player', a Ukrainian stringed instrument of the lute family, and more broadly — a performer of the musical material associated with the kobzar tradition.

The professional kobzar tradition was established during the Hetmanate Era around the sixteenth century in Ukraine. Kobzars accompanied their singing with a musical instrument known as the kobza, bandura, or lira. Their repertoire primarily consisted of para-liturgical psalms and "kanty", and also included a unique epic form known as dumas. 

At the turn of the nineteenth century there were three regional kobzar schools: Chernihiv, Poltava, and Slobozhan, which were differentiated by repertoire and playing style.

Guilds
In Ukraine, kobzars organized themselves into regional guilds or brotherhoods, known as tsekhs. They developed a system of rigorous apprenticeships (usually three years in length) before undergoing the first set of open examinations in order to become a kobzar. 

These guilds were thought to have been modelled on the Orthodox Church brotherhoods as each guild was associated with a specific church. These guilds then would take care of one church icon or purchase new religious ornaments for their affiliated church (Kononenko, p. 568–9). The Orthodox Church however was often suspicious of and occasionally even hostile to kobzars.

End of kobzardom

The institution of the kobzardom essentially ended in the Ukrainian SSR in the mid 1930s during Stalin's radical transformation of rural society which included the liquidation of the kobzars of Ukraine.  Kobzar performance was replaced with stylized performances of folk and classical music utilising the bandura.

Soviet version

Soviet kobzars were stylised performers on the bandura created to replace the traditional authentic kobzari who had been wiped out in the 1930s. These performers were often blind and although some actually had contact with the authentic kobzari of the previous generation, many received formal training in the Folk conservatories by trained musicians and played on contemporary chromatic concert factory made instruments. 

Their repertoire was primarily made up of censored versions of traditional kobzar repertoire and focused on stylized works that praised the Soviet system and Soviet heroes.

Re-establishment of the tradition

In recent times, there has been an interest in reviving of authentic kobzar traditions which is marked by the re-establishing the Kobzar Guild as a centre for the dissemination of historical authentic performance practice.

Other use of the term

Kobzar is a seminal book of poetry by Taras Shevchenko, the great national poet of Ukraine.

The term "kobzar" has on occasion been used for hurdy-gurdy players in Belarus (where the hurdy-gurdy is often referred to as a "kobza", and bagpipe players in Poland where the bagpipe is referred to as a "kobza" or "koza").

See also
 Blind musicians
Preservation of kobzar music

References

 Kononenko, Natalie O. “The Influence of the Orthodox Church on Ukrainian Dumy.” Slavic Review 50 (1991): 566–75.

External links 

 Kobzars  at Encyclopedia of Ukraine
 "Kobzar" book by Taras Shevchenko  at Encyclopedia of Ukraine
 National Union of the Ukrainian Kobzars official site (in Ukrainian)
 The last kobzar, a portrait of OSTAP KINDRACHUK, a film by Vincent Moon

Ukrainian music people
Kobzarstvo
Hurdy-gurdy players
Entertainment occupations
 
Occupations in music